is a Japanese football player.

Playing career
Amano was born in Tokyo on April 17, 2000. He joined J1 League club FC Tokyo from youth team in 2018.

References

External links

2000 births
Living people
Association football people from Tokyo
Japanese footballers
J1 League players
J3 League players
FC Tokyo players
FC Tokyo U-23 players
Association football midfielders